Puntioplites bulu is a species of ray-finned fish in the genus Puntioplites, it is a widespread species on mainland south-east Asia and on Borneo but it has been extirpated from Cambodia, and has become rarer in other parts of its range.

Footnotes

References

Bulu
Fish described in 1851